Sergio Santos Hernández (born November 1, 1963) is an Argentine professional basketball coach for Leones de Ponce of the Baloncesto Superior Nacional (BSN).

Head coaching career

Pro clubs
As a head coach, Hernández has won numerous titles over his career. They include: 6 Argentine League championships (2000, 2001, 2004, 2010, 2011, 2012), the South American League championship (2001), 3 Argentine Cups (2003, 2004, 2010), the Top 4 Tournament (2004), the South American Club Championship (2004), and 2 FIBA Americas League championships (2008, 2010).

On November 3, 2020, he has signed with Casademont Zaragoza of the Spanish Liga ACB.

Argentina national team
Hernández was the head coach the senior men's Argentina national basketball team from 2005 to 2010. He succeeded Rubén Magnano in the position, and was the team's head coach at the 2006 FIBA World Championship, the 2008 FIBA Diamond Ball (where the team won the gold medal), the 2008 Summer Olympics (where the team won a bronze medal), and at the 2010 FIBA World Championship (where Argentina finished in 5th place).

After his contract to coach the Argentina national team expired in 2010, Hernández did not accept the 4–6 years renewal offered by the Argentine Basketball Federation, therefore ending his tenure as the national team's head coach. He did, however, return to the team as an assistant coach for the 2012 Summer Olympics.

He then returned as the head coach of Argentina for the 2015 FIBA Americas Championship, where he led Argentina to a silver medal. He was also the head coach of Argentina at the 2016 Summer Olympics.

In 2019, he coached the Argentina´s team that won the 2019 Pan American gold medal in Lima.

In 2019, Hernandez coached the men's Argentina national basketball team at the 2019 FIBA Basketball World Cup, where he led Argentina to a silver medal; securing them a spot in the 2020 Summer Olympics.

References

1963 births
Living people
Argentine basketball coaches
Argentine expatriate basketball people in Brazil
Olympic coaches
Sportspeople from Bahía Blanca